Lowinsky is a surname. Notable people with the surname include: 

Christophe Lowinsky (born 1992), Martiniquais footballer
Edward Lowinsky (1908–1985), American musicologist
Ruth Lowinsky (1893–1958), English society hostess and food writer
Thomas Esmond Lowinsky (1892–1947), English painter